Peter Moss Fairclough (25 September 1887 – 16 November 1952) was an English cricketer active from 1911 to 1923 who played for Lancashire. He was born in Bickershaw and died in Blackpool. He appeared in 20 first-class matches as a righthanded batsman who bowled slow left arm orthodox. He scored 140 runs with a highest score of 19 and held nine catches. He took 52 wickets with a best analysis of seven for 27.

Notes

1887 births
1952 deaths
English cricketers
Lancashire cricketers